The Agricultural Fair Practices Act of 1967 (P.L. 90-288) was enacted to protect farmers from retaliation by handlers (buyers of their products) because the farmers are members of a cooperative. The act permits farmers to file complaints with USDA, which can then institute court proceedings, if they believe their rights under the law have been violated. Several bills have been introduced in recent years on behalf of producers (among them, some poultry growers who have contracts with large companies) to give them more bargaining power under the Act, which, some producers contend, lacks adequate enforcement authorities.

See also
Grain Inspection, Packers and Stockyards Administration
Packers and Stockyards Act

References

External links
 

1967 in law
1967 in the United States
90th United States Congress
United States federal agriculture legislation